Baeriopsis is a monotypic genus of flowering plants in the family Asteraceae, containing the single species Baeriopsis guadalupensis. It is endemic to the Guadalupe Island archipelago along the coast of Baja California in Mexico. It grows in Guadalupe mesa scrub habitat.

References

Madieae
Monotypic Asteraceae genera
Flora of Baja California
Flora of Mexican Pacific Islands